Atterbury House (formerly known as Shell House) is a  office skyscraper in Cape Town, South Africa. The 29 story building was completed in 1976. At the time it was completed, it became the 2nd tallest building in Cape Town, shorter than the  1 Thibault Square.

The building has been used as home to several major organizations and companies, including The Metropolitan Health Group, Department of Public Works, 
and Planet Fitness. Department of Education, Department of Mineral and Energy Affairs, and the Premier are the former notable tenants of the building.

On 12 June 2013, Ascension Properties bought the building for R341 million, equivalent to an acquisition yield of 8.7% at that time.

See also
 Skyscraper design and construction
 List of tallest buildings in Cape Town
 List of tallest buildings in Africa

References

Buildings and structures in Cape Town
Commercial buildings completed in 1976
Office buildings completed in 1976
20th-century architecture in South Africa